Soong Joo Ven (born 19 May 1995) is a Malaysian badminton player. He was part of the Malaysian team that won gold in the 2011 BWF World Junior Championships mixed team event.

Career

2011-2017 
He won silver medal at the 2012 Asia Junior Championships in the boys' singles event after losing to Kento Momota of Japan. He was the runner-up of the 2015 Malaysia International Challenge tournament in the men's singles event, and in 2016, he also became the runner-up of the Scottish Open Grand Prix tournament. In 2017, he reached the Thailand Open Grand Prix Gold semifinals.

2018 
He was a runner-up at the Hyderabad Open, where he lost to Sameer Verma in two games. He also had a few quarterfinal finishes at the German Open and the Korea Masters.

2019 
He won the Malaysia International by beating compatriot Cheam June Wei. He was also a semifinalist at the Indonesia Masters Super 100 event in Bangka Belitung.

2022 
Alongside Goh Jin Wei, he joined the Kuala Lumpur Badminton Club (KLRC) and is currently being coached by Nova Armada and former national player Sairul Amar Ayob. Shortly after, he lost in the second round of the India Open to Mithun Manjunath.

He then reached the semifinals of the Korea Masters and the Taipei Open.

Achievements

Asian Junior Championships 
Boys' singles

BWF World Tour (1 runner-up) 
The BWF World Tour, which was announced on 19 March 2017 and implemented in 2018, is a series of elite badminton tournaments sanctioned by the Badminton World Federation (BWF). The BWF World Tours are divided into levels of World Tour Finals, Super 1000, Super 750, Super 500, Super 300 (part of the HSBC World Tour), and the BWF Tour Super 100.

Men's singles

BWF Grand Prix (1 runner-up) 
The BWF Grand Prix had two levels, the Grand Prix and Grand Prix Gold. It was a series of badminton tournaments sanctioned by the Badminton World Federation (BWF) and played between 2007 and 2017.

Men's singles

BWF International Challenge/Series (1 title, 3 runners-up) 
Men's singles

  BWF International Challenge tournament
  BWF International Series tournament
  BWF Future Series tournament

Record against selected opponents 
Record against year-end Finals finalists, World Championships semi finalists, and Olympic quarter finalists. Accurate as of 24 July 2022.

References

External links 
 

1995 births
Living people
People from Selangor
Malaysian sportspeople of Chinese descent
Malaysian male badminton players
Badminton players at the 2018 Asian Games
Asian Games competitors for Malaysia
Competitors at the 2017 Southeast Asian Games
Competitors at the 2019 Southeast Asian Games
Southeast Asian Games silver medalists for Malaysia
Southeast Asian Games medalists in badminton